James Edward Burton (born August 21, 1939, in Dubberly, Louisiana) is an American guitarist. A member of the Rock and Roll Hall of Fame since 2001 (his induction speech was given by longtime fan Keith Richards), Burton has also been recognized by the Rockabilly Hall of Fame and the Musicians Hall of Fame and Museum. Critic Mark Deming writes that "Burton has a well-deserved reputation as one of the finest guitar pickers in either country or rock ... Burton is one of the best guitar players to ever touch a fretboard." He is ranked number 19 in Rolling Stone list of 100 Greatest Guitarists.

Since the 1950s, Burton has recorded and performed with an array of singers, including Bob Luman, Dale Hawkins, Ricky Nelson, Elvis Presley (and was leader of Presley's TCB Band), The Everly Brothers, Johnny Cash, Merle Haggard, Glen Campbell, John Denver, Gram Parsons, Emmylou Harris, Judy Collins, Jerry Lee Lewis, Claude King, Elvis Costello, Joe Osborn, Roy Orbison, Joni Mitchell, Hoyt Axton, Townes Van Zandt, Steve Young, Vince Gill, and Suzi Quatro.

Biography

Early life and career
Burton was born in Dubberly in south Webster Parish near Minden, Louisiana, to Guy M. Burton (1909–2001) and the former Lola Poland (1914–2011), a native of rural Fryeburg in Bienville Parish. She was the daughter of James and Althius Poland. Burton's wife is Louise Burton.

Self-taught, Burton began playing guitar during childhood. He was hired to be part of the staff band for the popular Louisiana Hayride radio show in Shreveport. While he was still a teenager, Burton left Shreveport for Los Angeles, where he joined Ricky Nelson's band. There, he made numerous recordings as a session musician. Burton created and played the guitar solo on Dale Hawkins 1957 hit song "Susie Q", a record that would become one of the Rock and Roll Hall of Fame's 500 Songs that Shaped Rock and Roll.

With Rick Nelson
Burton played guitar on the majority of Rick Nelson's songs recorded during the first 11 years of Nelson's career, beginning with his premiere at Master Recorders in Hollywood on November 18, 1957, for the classic "Stood Up"/"Waitin' in School" rockabilly single (Burton was relegated to rhythm as Joe Maphis was still playing lead guitar at the time). In 1965 he started working on the television program Shindig! which curtailed his touring with Nelson. However, Burton continued contributing to his friend's studio albums through the Perspective sessions in April 1968.

As a studio musician
The Shindig! exposure led to recording session work with a variety of artists, mostly as an unattributed sideman. In 1967 Burton played Dobro on the Richie Furay song, "A Child's Claim To Fame" on Buffalo Springfield's second album, Buffalo Springfield Again. Due to the volume of work, Burton turned down an offer to join Bob Dylan's first touring band, and another offer to play on Elvis Presley's 1968 comeback TV special Elvis.

With Elvis Presley
In 1969, Presley again asked Burton to join his show in Las Vegas, and, this time, Burton accepted. Burton organized the TCB Band, serving as its leader, and backed Presley from 1969 until Presley's death in 1977.  A hallmark of Elvis' live shows during this period was his exhortation, "Play it, James," as a cue for the guitarist's solos. For the first season in Vegas in 1969, Burton played his red standard Telecaster. Shortly thereafter, he purchased the now familiar pink paisley custom Telecaster. Burton was not sure that Elvis would like it; however, since Elvis did, Burton used it for every show.

Since 1998, Burton has played lead guitar in Elvis: The Concert which reunited some of Elvis' former TCB bandmates, background singers and Elvis' orchestral conductor Joe Guercio (mostly from the "concert years" 1969–1977) live on stage.

With John Denver
During 1975 and 1976, while still touring with Presley, Burton was one of the first members to join and tour with Emmylou Harris as part of her backing band, the "Hot Band", after the death of Gram Parsons. He was joined by a cast of talented musicians which included his bandmate with Presley, Glen D. Hardin, and newer musicians which included Rodney Crowell. However, once Presley was ready to return to the road, Burton returned to perform with him, although the others, including Hardin, elected to continue with Harris. Just before Presley died in 1977, Burton was called to play on a John Denver television special. During the taping, Denver asked if Burton would consider going on a European tour.  Burton said he was working with Elvis, but if scheduling permitted, he would be glad to go. Shortly after Elvis' death, Burton began a regular collaboration with Denver. The first album they recorded was I Want to Live.

During the sessions, Burton and Denver talked about a band. Glen Hardin and Jerry Scheff, from Presley's band, joined the new band too. Burton remained a member of Denver's band until 1994, but often toured in parallel with other artists including Jerry Lee Lewis. In the 16 years Burton worked with Denver, they recorded 12 albums and toured around the world. While touring with Denver, Burton carried several instruments, including backup Dobros and a spare 1969 Pink Paisley Fender Telecaster he had used as a touring guitarist with Elvis Presley during the 1970s. 
He rejoined Denver in 1995 for the Wildlife Concert. When Denver died in 1997, Burton spoke at his memorial service in Aspen, Colorado.

Recent career

 

Burton's later career included work with Ricky Nelson, Elvis Presley, John Denver, Merle Haggard, Gram Parsons, Rodney Crowell and Emmylou Harris. Beginning with King of America (1986), Burton recorded and toured with Elvis Costello intermittently for about a decade. In 1988, he was a prominent part of the acclaimed Cinemax special, Roy Orbison and Friends, A Black and White Night. In 1990, Burton moved back to his hometown of Shreveport permanently.

In fall 2004, Burton recorded Matt Lucas-Back in the Saddle Again, a sequel to the Matt Lucas album The Chicago Sessions.  The album features rockabilly and country music, and was released in May 2006 by Ten O Nine Records.

In 2005, Burton started the annual James Burton International Guitar Festival to raise money for his charitable foundation.  The festival is held in the Red River District of Shreveport.

In 2007 he was inducted into the Musicians Hall of Fame and Museum in Nashville, TN as a member of the L.A. session player group known as The Wrecking Crew. In 2008, Burton was asked by Brad Paisley to play on his upcoming album Play: The Guitar Album.  Burton went along for the ride and played on an instrumental track called "Cluster Pluck," as did Vince Gill, Steve Wariner, Redd Volkaert, Albert Lee, John Jorgenson, and Brent Mason.  At the 51st Grammy Awards in 2009, the song won Best Country Instrumental Performance.

On August 22, 2009, on stage at his James Burton International Guitar Festival, James Burton was inducted into The Louisiana Music Hall of Fame.

On July 15, 2010, Rolling Stone Magazine announced that Eric Clapton and James Burton would provide backup guitars on the track "You Can Have Her" for the Jerry Lee Lewis album Mean Old Man, scheduled for release in fall 2010.

In 2011, Burton was named one of "Five Living Legends of Shreveport" by Danny Fox of KWKH radio.

On June 9, 2012, Burton appeared in Shreveport at the Municipal Auditorium for a presentation of Garrison Keillor's Prairie Home Companion.

Equipment
Burton works with a variety of amplifiers to provide flexibility and a wide range of sounds. He has used a Music Man 210-150, an old Fender Twin with K model Lansing speakers, and a 1964 Fender Deluxe. His primary guitar has always been a Fender Telecaster, beginning with an early blonde model his parents bought for him around 1952. His 1969 Paisley Red (better known as Pink Paisley) Telecaster became the basis for his James Burton Telecaster model in 1991, with Lace Sensor pickups and a TBX tone circuit. Five years later his 1953 Candy Apple Red Telecaster was the inspiration for a standard version Artist Signature model featuring two Fender Texas Special Tele single coil pickups and a vintage-style 6-saddle bridge.  In 2006, the Signature Paisley model was redesigned with a red paisley flame design over a black body, plus three specially designed blade pickups, a no-load tone control and S-1 switching system.

Planned museum
The James Burton Foundation, a 501(c) non-profit organization at 714 Elvis Presley Avenue in Shreveport, is constructing the proposed "James Burton Guitar and Car Museum". The facility will showcase Burton's collection of guitars and classic cars as well as models from some of his celebrity friends.

Collaborations 
With Elvis Presley
 That's the Way It Is (RCA Records, 1970)
 Elvis Country (I'm 10,000 Years Old) (RCA Records, 1971)
 Love Letters from Elvis (RCA Records, 1971)
 Elvis Sings the Wonderful World of Christmas (RCA Records, 1971)
 Elvis Now (RCA Records, 1972)
 He Touched Me (RCA Records, 1972)
 Elvis (RCA Records, 1973)
 Raised on Rock / For Ol' Times Sake (RCA Records, 1973)
 Good Times (RCA Records, 1974)
 Promised Land (RCA Records, 1975)
 Today (RCA Records, 1975)
 From Elvis Presley Boulevard, Memphis, Tennessee (RCA Records, 1976)
 Moody Blue (RCA Records, 1977)

With Johnny Rivers
 Realization (Imperial Records, 1968)
 Slim Slo Slider (Imperial Records, 1970)
 Home Grown (United Artists Records, 1971)
 Wild Night (United Artists Records, 1976)

With Nancy Sinatra
 Sugar (Reprise Records, 1966)

With J. J. Cale
 Shades (Island Records, 1981)
 Travel-Log (Silvertone Records, 1990)

With Michael Nesmith
 The Wichita Train Whistle Sings (Dot, 1968)
 Nevada Fighter (RCA Records, 1971)

With Emmylou Harris
 Pieces of the Sky (Reprise Records, 1975)
 Elite Hotel (Reprise Records, 1975)
 Luxury Liner (Warner Bros. Records, 1977)
 Quarter Moon in a Ten Cent Town (Warner Bros. Records, 1978)
 Light of the Stable (Warner Bros. Records, 1979)
 Evangeline (Warner Bros. Records, 1981)
 Cimarron (Warner Bros. Records, 1981)

With Delaney & Bonnie
 Genesis (GNP, 1971)

With Gram Parsons
 GP (Reprise Records, 1973)
 Grievous Angel (Reprise Records, 1974)

With Evie Sands
 Any Way That You Want Me (Rev-Ola, 1970)

With Judy Collins
 Who Knows Where the Time Goes (Elektra Records, 1968)

With Rosanne Cash
 Right or Wrong (Columbia Records, 1980)

With Kim Carnes
 Rest on Me (Amos Records, 1971)

With Townes Van Zandt
Our Mother the Mountain (Poppy, 1969)

With Joni Mitchell
 For the Roses (Asylum Records, 1972)

With John Denver
 I Want to Live (RCA Records, 1977)
 John Denver (RCA Records, 1979)
 Autograph (RCA Records, 1980)
 Seasons of the Heart (RCA Records, 1982)
 It's About Time (RCA Records, 1983)
 Dreamland Express (RCA Records, 1985)
 One World (RCA Records, 1986)
 Higher Ground (RCA Records, 1988)
 Earth Songs (Windstar Records, 1990)
 Christmas, Like a Lullaby (Windstar Records, 1990)
 The Flower That Shattered the Stone (Windstar Records, 1990)
 Different Directions (Windstar Records, 1991)

With Ronnie Milsap
 Ronnie Milsap (Warner Bros. Records, 1971)

With Gillian Welch
 Revival (Almo Sounds, 1996)

With Glen Campbell
 Gentle on My Mind (Capitol Records, 1967)
 By the Time I Get to Phoenix (Capitol Records, 1967)
 I Knew Jesus (Before He Was a Star) (Capitol Records, 1973)

With Tina Turner
 Tina Turns the Country On! (United Artists Records, 1974)

With John Phillips
 John Phillips (John, the Wolf King of L.A.) (Dunhill Records, 1970)

With Nicolette Larson
 Nicolette (Warner Bros. Records, 1978)

With Kenny Rogers
 Share Your Love (Liberty Records, 1981)

With Carlene Carter
 I Fell in Love (Reprise Records, 1990)

With Elvis Costello
 King of America (F-Beat Records, 1986)
 Mighty Like a Rose (Warner Bros. Records, 1991)
 Kojak Variety (Warner Bros. Records, 1995)

With Michael Martin Murphey
 Michael Martin Murphey (Liberty Records, 1982)

With Arlo Guthrie
 Running Down the Road (Reprise Records, 1969)

With Brad Paisley
 Time Well Wasted (Arista Records, 2005)
 Play: The Guitar Album (Arista Records, 2008)

With Mark Collie
 Hardin County Line (MCA Records, 1990)
 Born and Raised in Black & White (MCA Records, 1991)

With Randy Newman
 Randy Newman (Reprise Records, 1968)

With Shawn Camp
 Shawn Camp (Reprise Records, 1993)
 1994 (Reprise Records, 2010)
  
With Ronnie Hawkins
 The Hawk (United Artists Records, 1979)

With Rodney Crowell
 Ain't Living Long Like This (Warner Bros. Records, 1978)

With Marshall Crenshaw
 Good Evening (Warner Bros. Records, 1989)

With Emmylou Harris and Rodney Crowell
 Old Yellow Moon (Nonesuch Records, 2013)

See also
 James Burton Telecaster
 Ricky Nelson
 Hybrid picking
 Elvis Presley
 TCB Band

References

External links
 
 The James Burton Foundation
 
 
 James Burton recordings at the Discography of American Historical Recordings.

1939 births
Living people
American country guitarists
American rock guitarists
American rockabilly guitarists
American male guitarists
American session musicians
Lead guitarists
People from Minden, Louisiana
Musicians from Shreveport, Louisiana
TCB Band members
The Wrecking Crew (music) members
Louisiana Republicans
Resonator guitarists
Guitarists from Los Angeles
Guitarists from Louisiana
People from Dubberly, Louisiana
20th-century American guitarists
Country musicians from California
Country musicians from Louisiana
20th-century American male musicians
The Strangers (American band) members
Stony Plain Records artists
Elvis Presley